The 1989 Minnesota Golden Gophers football team represented the University of Minnesota in the 1989 NCAA Division I-A football season. In their fourth year under head coach John Gutekunst, the Golden Gophers compiled a 6–5 record and were outscored by their opponents by a combined total of 283 to 263.

Kicker Brent Berglund, offensive lineman Dan Liimata, tailback Darrell Thompson and defensive tackle Mike Sunvold were named All-Big Ten second team.  Punter Brent Herbel was named Academic All-American.  Running back Pat Cummings, punter Brent Herbel, offensive lineman Dan Liimatta, offensive lineman Jon Melander, quarterback Scott Schaffner and linebacker Joel Staats were named Academic All-Big Ten.

Darrell Thompson was awarded the Bronko Nagurski Award and Bruce Smith Award.  Linebacker Eddie Miles was awarded the Carl Eller Award.  Brent Berglund was awarded the Bobby Bell Award.  Dan Liimatta was awarded the Butch Nash Award.  Jon Melander was awarded the Paul Giel Award.

Total attendance for the season was 237,552, which averaged out to 39,592 per game. The season high for attendance was against the Nebraska Cornhuskers.

Schedule

Personnel

Season summary

at Iowa State

Nebraska

Indiana State

Purdue

Darrell Thompson injured right knee midway through first quarter and did not return

at Northwestern

at Indiana

Ohio State

Wisconsin

at Michigan State

Michigan

at Iowa

First win versus Iowa since 1984
Biggest win versus Iowa since 1949

External links

References

Minnesota
Minnesota Golden Gophers football seasons
Minnesota Golden Gophers football